Steel (Italian: Acciaio) is a 1933 Italian drama film directed by Walter Ruttmann and starring Piero Pastore, Isa Pola and Vittorio Bellaccini. The film was shot on location at the steel mills in Terni in Umbria. It was based on the novel Giuoca, Pietro! by Luigi Pirandello. With its semi-documentary style it was one of a number of films made in the Fascist era that serve as a precursor to Italian neorealism which emerged in the mid-1940s.

Synopsis
Two steelworkers engage in a violent rivalry over a woman.

Cast
 Piero Pastore as Mario Velini 
 Isa Pola as Gina 
 Vittorio Bellaccini as Pietro Ricci
 Alfredo Polveroni as Pietro's father
 Olga Capri as Pietro's mother 
 Romano Calò
 Romolo Costa 
 Domenico Serra 
 Giulio Massarotti
 Arcangelo Aversa
 Enzo Paglierici
 Luigi Erminio D'Olivo

References

Bibliography 
Bondanella, Peter. A History of Italian Cinema. Continuum, 2009.
 Moliterno, Gino. The A to Z of Italian Cinema. Scarecrow Press, 2009.

External links 
 

1933 films
Italian drama films
Italian black-and-white films
1933 drama films
1930s Italian-language films
Films directed by Walter Ruttmann
Films shot in Italy
Films set in Italy
Films based on Italian novels
Films based on works by Luigi Pirandello
1930s Italian films